Hierosaurus (meaning "sacred lizard") is an extinct genus of nodosaurid ankylosaur which lived during the Late Cretaceous 87 to 82 million years ago. Its fossils were found in the Smoky Hill Chalk Member of the Niobrara Formation, in western Kansas, which would have been near the middle of the Western Interior Sea during the Late Cretaceous. It was a nodosaurid, an ankylosaur without a clubbed tail.
 
The only species of this genus, Hierosaurus sternbergii, was described by George Wieland on the basis of cranial and postcranial osteoderms collected by Charles Hazelius Sternberg in the Niobrara Formation of western Kansas. Nowadays, Hierosaurus is considered a nomen dubium, and a second species, H. coleii, was reassigned to the new genus Niobrarasaurus in 1995.

See also

 Timeline of ankylosaur research

References

Ornithischian genera
Nodosaurids
Late Cretaceous dinosaurs of North America
Fossil taxa described in 1909
Paleontology in Kansas
Nomina dubia